Beach City may refer to:

Places
 Beach City, Ohio
 Beach City, Texas
 A nickname for Berbera
 Beach City, Delmarva, a fictional town in the Cartoon Network show Steven Universe

Geography
 A coastal settlement with accessible beaches